A mezzaluna is a knife consisting of one or more curved blades with a handle on each end, which is rocked back and forth chopping the ingredients below with each movement.  They most commonly have a single blade, but are sometimes seen with two or three blades.

It is typically used for mincing herbs or garlic,  but it can be used for chopping other things such as cheese or meat. Very large single blade versions are sometimes used for pizza. Common uses in Italy include preparation of a soffritto or a pesto, etc.

Name
Mezzaluna means "half moon" in Italian, after the curved shape of the blade, and is the most common name used in the UK. Other names used include herb chopper, hachoir  (from French) and hokmesser (from Yiddish).

Cutting board
Mezzalunas may be found sold with a cutting board that has a shallow indentation in it, marketed as a herb chopper.

See also

Kitchen utensil 
Tumi
Ulu
Drawknife, a type of knife with two handles

References

Kitchen knives
Pizza